The 1st Anti-Aircraft Artillery Division() was created on March 12, 1950, from 2nd Garrison Brigade of Henan Military District. The division HQ was set in Wuchang, Hubei province. The division was then composed of:

1st Anti-Aircraft Artillery Regiment, then stationed in Leizhou Peninsula, equipped with Japanese 75-mm AA guns;
2nd Anti-Aircraft Artillery Regiment, then stationed in Peking, equipped with Japanese 75-mm AA guns;
3rd Anti-Aircraft Artillery Regiment, then stationed in Changsha and Guangzhou, equipped with Japanese 75-mm AA guns;
9th Anti-Aircraft Artillery Regiment, then stationed in Shenyang, equipped with Soviet 85-mm and 37-mm AA guns;
Radar Battalion.

From March 15 to 25, 1951, the division was utilized to organize the Air Defense Department, Middle-South Military Region. The division was then disbanded.

References
防空军回忆史料·大事记, 中国人民解放军历史资料编审委员会, /K·186, p.46-48.

Divisions of the People's Liberation Army
Air defence divisions
Artillery divisions
Military units and formations established in 1950
Military units and formations disestablished in 1951